Church of the Holy Ghost or Holy Ghost Catholic Church may refer to:

 Church of the Holy Ghost, Copenhagen, Denmark
 Holy Ghost Church, Basingstoke, Hampshire, England
 Church of the Holy Ghost, Crowcombe, Somerset, England
 Church of the Holy Ghost, Midsomer Norton, Somerset, England 
 Church of the Holy Ghost, Yeovil, Somerset, England
 Church of the Holy Ghost, Tallinn, Estonia
 Church of the Holy Ghost, Bern, Switzerland
 Holy Ghost Catholic Church (Bagamoyo), Tanzania
 Holy Ghost Catholic Church (Denver, Colorado), United States
 Holy Ghost Catholic Church (Kula, Hawaii), United States
 Holy Ghost Catholic Church (Dubuque, Iowa), United States
 Holy Ghost Byzantine Catholic Church (Pittsburgh), Pennsylvania, United States

See also
 Church of the Holy Spirit (disambiguation)